The Liquidity-at-Risk (short: LaR) is a measure of the liquidity risk exposure of a financial portfolio.

It may be defined as the net liquidity drain which can occur in the portfolio in a given risk scenario. 
If the Liquidity at Risk is greater than the portfolio's current liquidity position then the portfolio may face a liquidity shortfall.

Liquidity at Risk is different from other measures of risk based on total loss, as it is based on an estimate of cash losses, or liquidity outflows, as opposed to total loss.

Definition 
The Liquidity-at-Risk of a financial portfolio   associated with a stress scenario is the net liquidity outflow resulting from this stress scenario:

The liquidity shortfall in a stress scenario is thus given by the difference between
the Liquidity-at-Risk associated with the stress scenario and the amount of liquid assets
available at the point where the scenario occurs.

The concept of Liquidity at Risk is used in stress testing. It is a conditional measure, which depends on the stress scenario considered.

By analogy with Value-at-Risk one may also define a statistical notion of Liquidity at Risk,  at a given confidence level (e.g. 95%), which may be defined as the highest Liquidity at Risk that may occur across all scenarios considered under a probabilistic model, with probability higher than the confidence level.

This statistical notion of Liquidity at Risk is subject to model risk as it will depend on the probability distribution over scenarios.

Relation with other risk measures 
Liquidity at Risk is different from other measures of risk based on total loss, such as Value at Risk, as it is based on an estimate of cash losses, or liquidity outflows, as opposed to total loss.

See also 
 Margin at risk
 Value at risk
 Profit at risk
 Earnings at risk
 Cash flow at risk

References 

Mathematical finance
Financial risk
Monte Carlo methods in finance